Mark Tadeo Lapid (born February 16, 1980) is an actor and politician in the Philippines. He is a former Governor of Pampanga (2004–2007). President Gloria Arroyo appointed him as general manager of the Philippine Tourism Authority in 2008. From 2009 to 2016, he served as chief operating officer of the Tourism Infrastructure and Enterprise Zone Authority (TIEZA) under President Benigno Aquino III. TIEZA is an attached agency of the Department of Tourism (DOT) that designates, regulates and supervises tourism enterprise zones established under Republic Act 9593. Lapid returned to the government agency in 2021 after his appointment as TIEZA chief by President Rodrigo Duterte on January 5, 2021.

Political career
Mark Lapid began his career in public service at a very young age. He was elected as  SK (Sanggunian Kabataan) Chairman at the age of 16. Concurrently, Lapid served as the province's youth sector representative in the Sangguniang Panlalawigan of Pampanga.

He was elected Governor of Pampanga at the young age of 24. While Governor, Lapid successfully made Pampanga one of the top ten most productive provinces in the Philippines. Lapid's tenure as Governor was marked by an increase in infrastructure spending.

Lapid filed his CoC (Certificate of Candidacy) for Senator last October 14, 2015. Lapid ran under the Koalisyon ng Daang Matuwid but lost placing 19th in the polls, behind coalition mate, Jericho Petilla.

In a senatorial forum held on January 29, 2016, at the University of the Philippines – Diliman, he supported peace in Mindanao and same-sex marriage, which gave him one of the best approval applause from the students of UP.

Lapid belongs to the Aksyon Demokratiko Party.

Acting career
Lapid did the film Apoy sa Dibdib ng Samar (2006) with Cristine Reyes, directed by Jose Balagtas.

His film Tatlong Baraha, was an entry to the Metro Manila Film Festival (MMFF) in 2006. He played the role of Julio Valiente, Maynard Lapid as Zigomar, and Lito Lapid as Leon Guerrero.

Lapid produced the movie Lapu-Lapu starring Lito Lapid and Joyce Jimenez.

Personal life
He is among the four children of actor and Senator Lito Lapid and Marissa Tadeo-Lapid. His siblings are Maan Krista, Mitzi Karen and Maynard. He also has half-siblings such as Manuelito Lapid and Ysabel Ortega.

He is married to actress Tanya Garcia in a civil wedding on July 30, 2010, at Marissa Hall in Porac, Pampanga. They have two daughters, Mischa Amidala (born September 21, 2007), and Matilda Anika (born October 29, 2010) in Las Vegas, Nevada.

Filmography

Film

As actor
Largado, Ibabalik Kita Sa Pinanggalingan Mo! (1999)
Mahal Kita... Kahit Sino Ka Pa! (2001)
Dugong Aso: Mabuting Kaibigan, Masamang Kaaway (2001)
Pistolero (2002)
Apoy sa Dibdib ng Samar (2006)
Batas Militar (2006)
Tatlong Baraha (2006)
Ang Panday 2 (2011)Pacer 3 (2012)Pinoy Super Kid (2012)ABNKKBSNPLAko!? (2014)Ang Panday (2017)Jack Em Popoy: The Puliscredibles (2018)
3pol Trobol: Huli Ka Balbon (2019) (Noel Pahak)

As producerLapu-Lapu (2002)

TelevisionLittle Champ (2013) (young Leon Del Torro)FPJ's Ang Probinsyano (2017–2019) (Anton "Tigre" del Mundo)Sandugo (2019) (Darius Guerrero)
 FPJ's Batang Quiapo  '' (2023) (Ben)

References

External links
Governors of Pampanga

1980 births
Living people
Governors of Pampanga
Filipino actor-politicians
Heads of government agencies of the Philippines
Kabalikat ng Malayang Pilipino politicians
Male actors from Pampanga
ABS-CBN personalities
University of the Philippines Los Baños alumni
Aksyon Demokratiko politicians
Arroyo administration personnel
Benigno Aquino III administration personnel
Duterte administration personnel